Meena Shah (1937–2015) was a national badminton champion of India. Shah won twelve National titles including her seven consecutive in Women's singles from 1959 to 1965. She was a recipient of the Padma Shri and the Arjuna award.

Achievements

Asian Championships 
Women's singles

International tournaments 
Women's singles

Mixed doubles

References

1937 births
2015 deaths
Indian female badminton players
Indian national badminton champions
Sportspeople from Lucknow
Recipients of the Padma Shri in sports
Recipients of the Arjuna Award
Articles created or expanded during Women's History Month (India) - 2014
Sportswomen from Uttar Pradesh
20th-century Indian women
20th-century Indian people
Racket sportspeople from Uttar Pradesh
21st-century Indian women